Knud Gether (born 8 December 1946) is a Danish politician. He is a member of the Venstre political party. He was formerly a member of a local party, called Borgerlisten Langeland, and has been a member of Langeland Municipality's municipal council since the municipality's creation in 2007. Before that he sat in the municipal council of Sydlangeland Municipality from 1977, and was also the municipality's mayor from 1994, and until it was merged with Tranekær Municipality and Rudkøbing Municipality in 2007.

References 

1946 births
Living people
Danish municipal councillors
Mayors of places in Denmark
People from Frederiksberg Municipality
Venstre (Denmark) politicians